The 2015–16 Magyar Kupa, known as  for sponsorship reasons, was the 58th edition of the tournament.

Participating teams 
The following 48 teams qualified for the competition:

Map

Schedule
The rounds of the 2015–16 competition are scheduled as follows:

Matches 
A total of 48 matches will take place, starting with Round 1 on 22 September 2015 and culminating with the final on 1 May 2016 at the Városi Sportcsarnok in Szigetszentmiklós.

Round 1
The first round ties are scheduled for 22–23 September 2015.

|-
!colspan="3" style="background:#ccccff;"|22 September

|-
!colspan="3" style="background:#ccccff;"|23 September

|}

Round 2
The second round ties are scheduled for 7–14 October 2015.

|-
!colspan="3" style="background:#ccccff;"|7 October

|-
!colspan="3" style="background:#ccccff;"|8 October

|-
!colspan="3" style="background:#ccccff;"|9 October

|-
!colspan="3" style="background:#ccccff;"|11 October

|-
!colspan="3" style="background:#ccccff;"|13 October

|-
!colspan="3" style="background:#ccccff;"|14 October

|}

Round 3
The third round ties are scheduled for 4–11 November 2015.

|-
!colspan="3" style="background:#ccccff;"|4 November

|-
!colspan="3" style="background:#ccccff;"|10 November

|-
!colspan="3" style="background:#ccccff;"|11 November

|}

Round 4
The fourth round ties are scheduled for 11 December 2015 – 27 January 2016.

|-
!colspan="3" style="background:#ccccff;"|11 December

|-
!colspan="3" style="background:#ccccff;"|27 January

|}

Quarter-finals (Round 5)
The quarterfinals ties are scheduled for 10 February 2016.

|-
!colspan="3" style="background:#ccccff;"|10 February

|-
!colspan="3" style="background:#ccccff;"|12 February

|}

Final four
The final four will be held on 30 April and 1 May 2016 at the Városi Sportcsarnok in Szigetszentmiklós.

Awards
MVP:  Kinga Klivinyi (Érd)
Best Goalkeeper:  Kari Aalvik Grimsbø (Győri Audi ETO KC)

Semi-finals

Third place

Final

Final standings

See also
 2015–16 Nemzeti Bajnokság I

References

External links
 Hungarian Handball Federaration 

Magyar Kupa Women